Faverdines is a commune in the Cher department in the Centre-Val de Loire region of France.

Geography
The A71 autoroute runs through the eastern part of the commune's territory.

Population

Sights
 The fourteenth-century church of St. Aignan.
 The vestiges of a fortified feudal manorhouse at Chaudenay.

See also
Communes of the Cher department

References

Communes of Cher (department)
Bituriges Cubi